Leonard William "Len" Taylor (born January 16, 1952) is a Canadian politician and a former member of the Legislative Assembly of Saskatchewan, representing The Battlefords. Taylor is a member of the Saskatchewan New Democratic Party.

From 2000 to 2003, he served on the North Battleford, Saskatchewan city council, and was a federal NDP Member of Parliament in the House of Commons of Canada from 1988 until 1997, when he was defeated. He served as the party's House Leader from 1994 to 1996.

Taylor was first elected to the Legislative Assembly of Saskatchewan in the re-created district of The Battlefords in 2003, and was named to cabinet following the election as Minister of Government Relations.  He became been Saskatchewan's Minister of Health in February 2006, and was previously Government House Leader in the Saskatchewan New Democratic Party (NDP) government. Taylor left government when his party was relegated to the opposition benches in the 2007 election, but held his own seat. He was defeated by Saskatchewan Party challenger Herb Cox in the 2011 election.

Prior to entering politics, Taylor worked as a journalist.

Electoral record 

|-

 
|NDP
|Len Taylor
|align="right"|2,475
|align="right"|35.83%
|align="right"|-7.99%

|Liberal
|Ryan Bater
|align="right"|812
|align="right"|11.76%
|align="right"|-1.60%

|- bgcolor="white"
!align="left" colspan=3|Total
!align="right"|6,907
!align="right"|100.00%
!align="right"|

|-
 
| style="width: 130px" |NDP
|Len Taylor
|align="right"|3,056
|align="right"|42.53%
|align="right"|*
 
|Liberal
|Jack Hillson
|align="right"|2,134
|align="right"|29.70%
|align="right"|*

|- bgcolor="white"
!align="left" colspan=3|Total
!align="right"|7,185
!align="right"|100.00%
!align="right"|

External links 

 MLA biography
 
 

1952 births
Journalists from Saskatchewan
Living people
Members of the House of Commons of Canada from Saskatchewan
Members of the Executive Council of Saskatchewan
New Democratic Party MPs
People from North Battleford
Saskatchewan New Democratic Party MLAs
21st-century Canadian politicians